The Uecker Monument is a public art work by artist Brian Maughan. It is located in front of the American Family Field stadium west of downtown Milwaukee, Wisconsin. The sculpture depicts Bob Uecker, the popular play-by-play announcer for broadcasts of Milwaukee Brewers baseball games. It was dedicated on August 31, 2012.

References

2012 establishments in Wisconsin
2012 sculptures
Bronze sculptures in Wisconsin
Cultural depictions of baseball players
Milwaukee Brewers
Monuments and memorials in Wisconsin
Outdoor sculptures in Milwaukee
Sculptures of men in Wisconsin
Sculptures of sports
Statues in Wisconsin